Fred Rogers was an American football coach.  He was the third head football coach at Drake University in Des Moines, Iowa, serving for the 1896 season and compiling a record of 2–3.

Head coaching record

References

Year of birth missing
Year of death missing
Drake Bulldogs football coaches